Drink is a 1917 British silent drama film directed by Sidney Morgan and starring Fred Groves, Irene Browne and Alice O'Brien.  It was the film version of a play by Charles Reade, first performed in 1879 and based on Émile Zola's novel, L'Assommoir.

Plot 
A laundress takes to drink and dies after her alcoholic husband goes mad.

Cast
 Fred Groves as Coupeau 
 Irene Browne as Gervaise 
 Alice O'Brien as Virginie 
 George Foley as Gouget 
 Lionel d'Aragon as Auguste Lautier 
 Arthur Walcott as Chabot 
 Joan Morgan as Gervaise, as a child 
 Stanley Arthur as Bibi 
 William Brandon as Mes-Bottes

References

Bibliography
 Murphy, Robert. Directors in British and Irish Cinema: A Reference Companion. British Film Institute, 2006.

External links
 

1917 films
British drama films
British silent feature films
Films directed by Sidney Morgan
1917 drama films
British black-and-white films
1910s English-language films
1910s British films
Silent drama films